Companc is a surname. Notable people with the surname include:

Ezequiel Pérez Companc (born 1994), Argentine racing driver
Gregorio Pérez Companc (born 1934), Argentina's wealthiest individual
Luis Pérez Companc (born 1972), Argentine rally driver
Pablo Pérez Companc (born 1982), Argentine racing driver